Kateryna Dorogobuzova (born June 28, 1990) is a Ukrainian basketball player for UMCS Lublin and the Ukrainian national team.

She participated at the EuroBasket Women 2017.

References

1990 births
Living people
Sportspeople from Odesa
Small forwards
Ukrainian expatriate basketball people in Poland
Ukrainian women's basketball players